The Amanuensis is the second studio album by British progressive metal band Monuments. It was released on 23 June 2014 through Century Media Records. The album takes its title from the novel Cloud Atlas by David Mitchell, while according to guitarist John Browne, the album's lyrics refer to the Samsara Cycle: "The cyclical existence of life that we are all bound to. Chris has written an entire story around the lyrics. Maybe that will see the light one day! It's the story of Samsara." It is the band's first album with vocalist Chris Barretto.

Critical reception

Ultimate Guitar gave the album a positive review, stating that the band has grown and developed into some truly interesting modern metal, while also adding, "this album feels like it was made to be played as a full album and it flows from one track to the next in a pleasant way and none of the tracks are subpar." Sputnikmusic also praised the album, saying, "Monuments add a slice of melody to their crushingly groovy sound" giving the album an 'excellent' score. They also praised the album's production, stating: "The production here is also the best it's ever been – the stringed instruments here are punchy, powerful and clear, and the vocals sound natural and unmolested. The smoothness of the mix balances out the aggressive nature of the music to create something that rests somewhere in between." According to a review by The Circle Pit, "In a sea of DeathDjentCore bands, Monuments are one of the few that set the bar higher for themselves with every release and also set a benchmark for similar music/musicians to be ranked by", and they state the album is "definitely worth your time and money and more."

Track listing

Personnel
Monuments
 Chris Barretto – vocals, saxophone, concept
 John Browne – guitar, production, mixing, mastering, concept 
 Olly Steele – guitar
 Adam Swan – bass
 Mike Malyan – drums, samples

Additional personnel
 Romesh Dodangoda – drum production
 Eyal Levi – vocal production, vocal mixing
 Robert Turner, Liam Ross and Felix Mercer – drum engineering
 Emilio Arteaga – assistant vocal engineering
 Fall McKenzie – artwork, layout, design
 Kris Davidson – additional artwork

References

2014 albums
Monuments (metal band) albums
Century Media Records albums